Pakistan Olympic Association was created in 1948, while Pakistan Sports Board was established in 1962. Pakistan first participated in the  Olympic Games in 1948 in London, and has sent athletes to compete in every Summer Olympic Games since then, except for when they participated in the American-led boycott of the 1980 Summer Olympics in Soviet Union.

Pakistan first participated in the Winter Olympic Games at the Vancouver 2010 Winter Olympics, when Mohammad Abbas became Pakistan's first athlete to qualify in the Alpine Skiing (Giant Slalom) category.

Pakistani athletes have won a total of ten medals, all in the Summer Olympics. Pakistan's Men's Field Hockey team won eight medals in the nine games it participated in between 1956 and 1992, which included a run of 5 consecutive finals between 1956 and 1972, that yielded 2 gold medals and 3 silver medals in quick succession.

Rome 1960 has been the most successful Olympics for Pakistan, with Pakistan winning two medals; a gold medal in field hockey and a bronze medal in wrestling.

Pakistan has won two individual medals in the Olympics to date, both bronze medals; one in wrestling in Rome 1960 and one in boxing in Seoul 1988. Pakistan has not won a single medal at the Olympic games since 1992 Barcelona. 

At the 2020 Summer Olympics in Tokyo, Arshad Nadeem made history by becoming the first ever Pakistani athlete to qualify for a track and field final at the Olympics.

Participation and medal tables

Summer Olympics

Winter Olympics

Medals by sport

List of medalists

Men's Field Hockey team at the Summer Olympics 

TBD (to be determined), DNQ (did not qualify), DNP (did not participate)

Milestones

Firsts 

First Athletics Final: , Arshad Nadeem, Javelin Throw

Multiple Medalists

Best Performances (Athletics)

See also
 List of flag bearers for Pakistan at the Olympics
 Olympic competitors for Pakistan
 Pakistan at the Asian Games
 Pakistan at the Commonwealth Games
 Pakistan at the Paralympics
 Pakistan at the World Games

References

External links